Protein AF-9 is a protein that in humans is encoded by the MLLT3 gene.

Interactions
MLLT3 has been shown to interact with BCOR.

References

Further reading